Redha Hassan Tukar Fallatha (born 29 November 1975 in Medina) is a Saudi Arabian former footballer who played as a defender for Al Ittihad.

Tukar started his career at second division Ohod before joining Al-Shabab, with whom he won the 2000–01 Asian Cup Winners' Cup. He subsequently moved to Al Ittihad and was part of the 2005 AFC Champions League winners.

He was also a member of the Saudi Arabian national team and was called up to the squad to participate in the 2006 FIFA World Cup. He also participated in the 2002 FIFA World Cup.

Honours
 with Al-Iittihad
 Saudi Premier League (2): 2006–07, 2008–09
 Kings Cup (2): 2010, 2013
 Crown Prince Cup (1): 2004
 AFC Champions League (2): 2004, 2005
 Arab Champions League (1): 2004–05

References

External links

                   

1975 births
Living people
Saudi Arabian footballers
Ohod Club players
Al-Shabab FC (Riyadh) players
Ittihad FC players
2002 FIFA World Cup players
2004 AFC Asian Cup players
2006 FIFA World Cup players
2007 AFC Asian Cup players
Saudi Arabia international footballers
Association football defenders
People from Medina
Saudi First Division League players
Saudi Professional League players